Letizia Gambi is an Italian singer-songwriter and actress. Her music is a fusion between her Italian and Neapolitan heritage and Black Jazz American roots.  Gambi performs and records in English, Italian, Neapolitan and Spanish and is best known for her work with Lenny White, Ron Carter, Gato Barbieri, Chick Corea, Wallace Roney, Patrice Rushen, Gil Goldstein, Helen Sung, Pete Levin. She has won a San Gennaro Award and was nominated for the Targa Tenco.

Early life and education 
Letizia Gambi was born in Naples, Italy, to an artistic family. Her family moved to Como where she studied art and dancing. Later Gambi moved to Milan where she studied acting and singing. She graduated from Milan's International Jazz School with a master's degree in Jazz vocal performance.

Career 
Work with Lenny White

In 2009 Gambi met Lenny White playing with Chick Corea and Stanley Clarke at the Blue Note in Milan. As result of their meeting, White produced her 2012 debut album “Introducing Letizia Gambi", 3 singles and 2016 album “ Blue Monday”. Gambi's collaboration with Lenny White included work with Ron Carter, Gato Barbieri, Chick Corea, Wallace Roney, Patrice Rushen, Gil Goldstein, Helen Sung, Dave Stryker, Pete Levin, Donald Vega, Pedrito Martinez, John Benitez, Hector Del Curto, Jisoo Ok, Antonio Faraò, Max Ionata, Dario Rosciglione.

Letizia Gambi in 3D 

In 2018 Gambi formed an all female band under the name Letizia Gambi in 3D, members of the band include Elisabetta Serio on piano and Giovanna Famulari on cello.

Personal life 
In 2009, Gambi experienced SSNHL (Sudden Sensorineural Hearing Loss) leading to total permanent hearing loss in her right ear. Her brother Gianpaolo Gambi, is an actor, TV host and writer. Her uncle is an opera singer. She lives between New York and Miami.

Discography

Singles 

 2014: My Town (Carmela) (Lounge Mix by MDB)
 2019: Blue Monday single
 2019: Under the Moon (feat. Lenny White, Gil Goldstein, Helen Sung)

Albums 

 2012: Introducing Letizia Gambi 
 2016: Blue Monday

Notable album appearances 

 2020: “Come Musica”- Fahir Atakoğlu on “For Love” (lyrics and vocals)

References 

Italian women singer-songwriters
Italian singer-songwriters
Musicians from Naples
Crossover jazz singers
Italian jazz singers
Women jazz singers
English-language singers from Italy
21st-century Italian women singers
Living people
Italian women singers
Actresses from Naples
Neapolitan language
Vocal jazz
Easy listening music
21st-century Italian singers
Year of birth missing (living people)